Speck Alto Adige PGI (Ladin language: Cioce or Ciociul; German: Südtiroler Speck g.g.A.) is a dry-cured, lightly smoked ham produced in South Tyrol, northern Italy. Parts of its production are regulated by the European Union under the protected geographical indication (PGI) status (see also Tyrolean Speck).

Unlike prosciutto crudo, Alto Adige Speck is smoked (prosciutto affumicato).

History 

The first documents containing the word "speck" date back to the 18th century, although it already appears in the butcher regulations and in the accounting records of the Tyrolean princes in the year 1200 under different names and definitions.

Initially, speck was produced in order to preserve the meat for a long time. It was a method that allowed families to have access throughout the year to the meat of the pigs butchered around Yuletide. Most importantly, speck was the only opportunity the poorer echelons of society had of eating meat and of acquiring lipids. Over time it became one of the main courses for feasts and banquets. Today it is still the star of the South Tyrolean “snack” served together with bread and wine.

Speck is a product typical of South Tyrol and originates from the merging of two different meat conservation methods: curing, typical of the cured ham of the Mediterranean area, and smoking, typical of Northern Europe. As a location at the crossways between northern and southern Europe, and thanks to its unique climate, South Tyrol has blended the two methods to produce speck according to the rule of "a little salt, a little smoke and a lot of fresh air", consisting in light curing and in the alternation between smoke and fresh air.

Initially, speck was produced only by individual farmer families. Later on, its production was taken up by the workshops of local butchers and in the 60s it became an industrial product.

Production 

Speck Alto Adige is produced by light smoking of salted pork hind quarters followed by an approximately 22-week-long curing period and the application of a special crust of salt that must never exceed 5% of the final product.

The element shared by all small and large speck producers is their compliance with the "a little salt, a little smoke and a lot of fresh air" rule. Production consists in five phases: selection of raw materials, salting, smoking, curing, inspections and quality marking.

To produce Speck Alto Adige PGI lean, firm pork thighs are used. The hind quarters are selected according to the criteria defined in the raw materials specifications and trimmed following traditional methods. They are branded with the date of production start as reference for later inspections.

The speck hams are salted and flavoured with a mixture of aromas (salt, pepper, juniper, rosemary and bay). They are then dry-corned for three weeks at controlled temperatures and turned over various times to help the corning penetrate.

Then the hams are exposed alternately to the smoking and to the drying phases. The smoking phase is light and is done over low-resin wood so as not to give the speck too strong a flavour, and the smoke temperature must never exceed 20 °C.

In the final phase, the hams are cured by being put up to dry in rooms pervaded by fresh air. The ageing period is defined considering the final weight of the ham, and usually lasts about 22 weeks. In this phase, a natural layer of aromatic mould forms on the hams and is then removed at the end of the ageing process. The mould layer finishes off the characteristic taste of the speck and prevents it from becoming excessively dry.

The speck that meets the production criteria imposed by the production standards and that has passed controls is fire-branded in 4 different places of the rind with the specific seal.

Inspection and quality brand 
Speck Alto Adige PGI is protected by the European Union as a Protected Geographical Indication (PGI). This status is assigned only to selected products obtained according to traditional methods and in specific geographical areas.

To guarantee the quality and authenticity of Speck Alto Adige PGI, the quality consortium Südtiroler Speck Consortium, together with the independent control institute INEQ (Istituto Nord Est Qualità), has developed an inspection system applied to all production phases, from meat selection to the finished product.

Nutrition information 
Speck Alto Adige PGI has a high protein content. The nutrition facts per 100 g serving are:

Speck as key element of the South Tyrolean snack 

In South Tyrol, speck was traditionally a farmers’ fare, a source of energy during their work in the fields. Over time, it became one of the main courses in banquets for festivities and welcoming ceremonies. The latter function has reached our modern times, when speck, together with bread and wine, is served as the typical South Tyrolean "snack", offered as a sign of hospitality.

"Marende" is the local name of the snack ("Brettljause" in German). The snack consists of a wooden cutting board loaded with speck, sausages, local cheeses and pickled cucumbers, served together with farmers’ bread and wine. For the "Marende", the speck is served in a single piece about 3 cm wide and then cut into smaller pieces.

Events linked to Speck Alto Adige PGI

The most famous event linked to Speck Alto Adige PGI is the Südtiroler Speckfest, namely the traditional speck festival held each year in fall in St. Magdalena, Villnöß/Funes, at the base of the Dolomites mountain range. The Südtiroler Speckfest, in 2010 at its 8th edition, is an event organized together by the Villnöß tourism association, the Südtiroler Speck Consortium quality consortium and the EOS – South Tyrol Export Organization of the Chamber of Commerce of Bolzano. Each year, at the festival, Hans Mantinger "Gletscherhons", a master in the art of slicing speck, presents his surprise creations.

See also

 Tyrolean Speck
 List of hams
 List of smoked foods

References

External links 
 Speck dell' Alto Adige: Application for PGI Registration (EN/06/95/94700000.P00 (IT) dcy/dcy), European Commission.
 Denomination Information for Speck dell'Alto Adige / Südtiroler Markenspeck / Südtiroler Speck, European Commission.
 Official website of the PGI product

Italian cuisine
Salumi
Ham
Cuisine of South Tyrol
Italian products with protected designation of origin
Smoked meat